Pedro Gonzaga, commonly known as Pedro Bambú  is a Brazilian footballer who plays as a defensive midfielder for Vila Nova.

Career
He rejoined Atlético Goianiense for a second spell in June 2018, having made over a hundred Campeonato Brasileiro Série B appearances for the club between 2013 and 2016, and spending two seasons with local rivals Goiás. He previously played in 2013 Campeonato Brasileiro Série D for Tiradentes-CE, who were eventually knocked out at the quarter-final stage.

References

External links
 

Living people
1987 births
Brazilian footballers
Association football midfielders
Campeonato Brasileiro Série B players
Campeonato Brasileiro Série D players
Atlético Clube Goianiense players
Goiás Esporte Clube players
Vila Nova Futebol Clube players